The Association of Maltese Arms Collectors and Shooters (AMACS) is a Maltese umbrella association for sport shooting and arms collectors.

AMACS is Malta's representative for the international shooting organizations Federation of European Societies of Arms Collectors (FESAC), World Field Target Federation (WFTF), International Practical Shooting Confederation (IPSC), World Crossbow Shooting Association (WCSA) and the International Metallic Silhouette Shooting Union (IMSSU).

See also 
 List of shooting sports organizations

Other umbrella organizations for shooting 
 French Shooting Federation
 Finnish Shooting Sport Federation
 Hellenic Shooting Federation
 Monaco Shooting Federation
 Norwegian Shooting Association
 Royal Spanish Olympic Shooting Federation
 Swiss Shooting Sport Federation

References

External links 
 Official homepage of the Association of Maltese Arms Collectors and Shooters

Regions of the International Practical Shooting Confederation
Sports organisations of Malta